The following are temples located in Tirunelveli, India.

Temples

Nellaiappar Temple

Nellaiappar Temple is one of the largest Shiva Temples of Tamil Nadu. The temple is situated in the centre of the city at a distance of two kilometres from the railway station in Tirunelveli Town. The main Railway station is situated in Tirunelveli Junction railway station. It is a twin temple dedicated to Parvati and Shiva.

Sri Varadharaja Perumal Kovil

Sri Varadharaja Perumal Kovil is situated at Tirunelveli Junction. This temple is an ancient and reputed Vishnu temple. It lies on the banks of the Thamirabarani River.

Mela Thiruvenkatanathapuram Temple

The Mela Thiruvenkatanathapuram temple's sanctum has a Lord Srinivasa statue. This temple is also called Thirunankovil.

Keezha Thiruvenkatanathapuram Temple

Sri Varadharaja Perumal Kovil is located in Keezha Thiruvengadanaadhapuram, which is just half a kilometer from the Then Thirupathi Shri Venkataachalapathy Temple. Due to presence of red soil in the area where the temple is located, it derives its name of Sengani - Sen meaning Red and Kani meaning Land in Tamil. The name was later changed to Sangani.

Sri Kalakodi Dharma Sastha Temple Karakurichi
This is near Tirunelveli. Nearest location is Ambasamudram. When travelling towards Karakurichi from Nagercoil, we pass through Thovala, Ervadi, Kalakkad, Cheranmahadevi and next Karakurichi and road goes to AmbaSamudram and from there to Papanasam.

An Ayyappa temple is situated in Karakurichi, Sri Kalakodi Dharma Sastha Temple, near a river, people call it koovam. Lord Ayyappa is the main deity, sub deities are Ganapathy, Shiva, Navagrahas and Veera Bhadran. Navagrahas are present along with their wives, that is Dampathy Sametha. Kumbhabhisekam of the temple was conducted recently. Two festivals are important here; that is during Mandala Pooja and Panguni Utthra. A Laksharchana is conducted during Mandala Pooja with other abhisekhams.

Sri Chekkadi Saasthaa Temple
Between Nellai Appar Sannadhi and Ghandimathi Amman Sannadhi there is a small lane near Saraswathi Ambaal temple. Through that lane is Chekkadi Saastha temple (Lord Ayyappan with Poorana, Pushkala), an ancient temple.

Azhagiya Kootthar and Sivagami Ambal Temple
Sri Azhagiya Koothar Temple at Rajavallipuram near Tirunelveli is a Natarajar temple situated on the banks of Tamirabarani River. Locals also refer to it as Sepparai. Lord Natarajar and Sivagami Ambal are the main deities while Nellaiappar, Gandhimathi Ambal amongst others, are minor deities. Kumbhavisekam was conducted in January 2007. Two important festivals here are Aani Therottam and Margazhi Thiruvadhira.

Vaithya Lingam Temple

The temple's sanctum has sri vaithya lingam swami and goddess yogambigai. The other deities of the temple for various castes of people are Sudalai Madan Samy and Karuppa Samy.

Sree Sudalai Eswarar  Thirukovil 
The temple's sanctum has Lord shiva, Ganesh, sri Sudalai Eswarar, Sivanaitha Perumal. The other deities of the temple Bala sudalai, Pathirakali Amman, Karrupasamy, Bhrama sakthi, Sathiraathi Mundaswamy, Pechi amman, Muneswarar

Hindu temples in Tirunelveli district